On 28 June 1981 (7 Tir 1360 in the Iranian calendar;), a powerful bomb went off at the headquarters of the Islamic Republican Party (IRP) in Tehran, while a meeting of party leaders was in progress. Seventy-four leading officials of the Islamic Republic of Iran were killed, including Chief Justice Ayatollah Mohammad Beheshti, who was the second most powerful figure in the Iranian Revolution (after Ayatollah Ruhollah Khomeini). The Iranian government first blamed SAVAK and the Iraqi regime. Two days later, on 30 June, the People's Mujahedin of Iran was accused by Khomeini of being behind the attack. Several non-Iranian sources also believe the bombing was conducted by the People's Mujahedin of Iran.

Bombing 

On 28 June 1981, the Hafte tir bombing occurred, killing the chief justice and party secretary Ayatollah Mohammad Beheshti, four cabinet ministers (health, transport, telecommunications and energy ministers), twenty-seven members of the Majlis, including Mohammad Montazeri, and many other government officials.

Immediate aftermath 
Khomeini accused the PMOI to be responsible and, according to BBC journalist Baqer Moin, the Mujahedin were "generally perceived as the culprits" for the bombing in Iran. The Mujahedin never publicly confirmed or denied any responsibility for the deed. They stated that the attack was "a natural and necessary reaction to the regime's atrocities."

Iranian investigation and judicial proceedings
SAVAK and Iraq were immediately held responsible by Iranian authorities, but two days later the People's Mujahedin of Iran (MEK) was blamed. On 6 July, the bomber was finally identified as a 23-year-old man named Mohammad Reza Kolahi. Kolahi had secured a job in the building disguised as a sound engineer. Iran accused Kolahi of being a member of the MEK. But one Iranian dissident said the government did not find him having any organizational links.

According to Tasnim, it is not possible that MEK to be fully responsible for the incident, and the bomb had been transmitted to Iran or built by military technicians in the country, with the help of Western and Israeli spy services. In other words, the United States and Israel, with the sophisticated technology of that day, designed the bomb and plan of operation then presented the bomb and plan to MEK for operating.

Several years later, Iran executed four "Iraqi agents" for the bombing. In 1985, Iranian military intelligence stated that the bombing was not conducted by the MEK but by pro-monarchy officers in the Iranian army.

Aftermath 
Many scholarly sources believe the People's Mujahedin of Iran (MEK) was responsible for the bombing.
 Anthony Cordesman writes that this bombing, along with 1981 Iranian Prime Minister's office bombing, turned Iranian public opinion against the MEK and expanded Iranian government crackdown on the group. 

According to Ervand Abrahamian, "whatever the truth, the Islamic Republic used the incident to wage war on the Left opposition in general and the Mojahedin in particular." 

According to Kenneth Katzman, "there has been much speculation among academics and observers that these bombings may have actually been planned by senior IRP leaders, to rid themselves of rivals within the IRP." 

The 2006 U.S. department of state Country report says that "In 1981, the MEK detonated bombs in the head office of the Islamic Republic Party and the Premier's office, killing some 70 high-ranking Iranian officials."

Assassinations of "leading officials and active supporters of the regime by the Mujahedin were to continue for the next year or two," though they failed to overthrow the government.

Commemoration
To commemorate the event several public places in Iran including major squares in Tehran and other cities are named “Hafte Tir”.

Assassination of Mohammad-Reza Kolahi 
Mohammad-Reza Kolahi, accused of being involved in the bombing, was murdered in 2015. Kolahi was living in the Netherlands under false identity of Ali Motamed as a refugee, was married to an Afghan woman and had a 17-year-old son. Iran denied it was involved in the murder.

See also 
 Mahmoud Ghandi
 Hassan Abbaspour

References 

1981 crimes in Iran
1981 in politics
20th century in Tehran
Attacks on buildings and structures in Iran
Conflicts involving the People's Mojahedin Organization of Iran
Crime in Tehran
Explosions in Iran
History of Tehran
History of the Islamic Republic of Iran
Iranian timelines
June 1981 events in Asia
Mass murder in 1981
Political history of Iran
Terrorist incidents in Iran
Terrorist incidents in Asia in 1981
Terrorist incidents in Iran in 1981